Charles L. "Charlie" Copeland (born 1963) is an American politician. A member of the Republican Party, he served in the Delaware Senate as minority leader and also as chair of the Delaware Republican Party.

Early life and career
Copeland is the grandson of Lammot du Pont Copeland and a member of the du Pont family. Copeland attended Tower Hill in Wilmington, Delaware, graduating in 1981. He enrolled at Duke University, where he earned a degree in physics and computer science.

As a teenager, he did not want to work at the family company, DuPont, but nevertheless began working there in 1985 after graduating from college. He worked in several departments but left after seven years. He later expressed criticism of the merger between DuPont and Dow Chemical in 2017 to create DowDuPont, claiming it would be "catastrophic for Delaware."

In 1994, he obtained an MBA from the Fuqua School of Business and moved back to Wilmington to manage a family commercial printing company. Three years later, he co-founded the Challenge Program, a Wilmington-based vocational training and job placement program for at-risk youth. The program provides training in construction skills and includes a workshop that produces high-end furniture. Copeland now serves on the board of directors. He previously served on the board of the Longwood Foundation, which was founded by Pierre S. du Pont in 1937, as well as on the board for the Mt. Cuba Center in Brandywine, Delaware.

Political career
In 2002, Copeland challenged incumbent Republican senator, Dallas Winslow, for the Senate District 4 seat, which covers parts of Brandywine Hundred and Hockessin. He won both the primary election and general election by wide margins. He was elected minority leader in 2006 until he resigned his seat in June 2008 to run for lieutenant governor, which is elected independently from the governor in Delaware. However, he lost in the general election by 22 percent to Democrat Matt Denn, who was then the state insurance commissioner.

In June 2013, he was elected chair of the Republican State Committee of Delaware at a special convention in Dover to replace John C. Sigler, who had abruptly resigned in May. As chair, he was a delegate to the 2016 Republican National Convention and strongly defended Donald Trump for the Republican nomination. He resigned as party chair in 2017 after becoming president of the Intercollegiate Studies Institute, a nonprofit organization that builds conservative values among college students.

Electoral history
In 2002, Copeland challenged incumbent Republican Dallas Winslow and won the primary election with 2,151 votes (62.8%). He went on to win the general election with 11,592 votes (72.3%) against Democrat nominee Fred J. Boykin.
In 2004, Copeland was unopposed in the general election, winning 16,289 votes.
In 2008, Copeland ran for lieutenant governor but lost in the three-way general election to Matt Denn, who gained 61.3% of the vote.

References

1963 births
Living people
Republican Party Delaware state senators
State political party chairs of Delaware
Republican National Committee members
People from Wilmington, Delaware